Dishub Station is a station of the Palembang LRT Line 1. The station is located between  station and  station. Nearby the station is South Sumatra Province's Office of Transportation (Dinas Perhubungan Provinsi Sumatera Selatan, abbreviated as Dishub), hence its name.

The station was opened on 20 September 2018, after the 2018 Asian Games had concluded.

Station layout

References

Palembang
Railway stations in South Sumatra
Railway stations opened in 2018